Heritage Field  is a public use airport in Montgomery County, Pennsylvania, United States. It is 
located three nautical miles (6 km) east of Pottstown, in Limerick Township. The airport is privately owned by Limerick Aviation LP.

Previously known as Pottstown Limerick Airport, the airport was sold in 2009 by its former owner, the Exelon Generation Company, which also owns the nearby Limerick Nuclear Power Plant. It is now referred as Heritage Field on the local UNICOM.

This is included in the National Plan of Integrated Airport Systems for 2011–2015, which categorized it as a general aviation reliever airport.

Facilities and aircraft 
Heritage Field covers an area of 220 acres (89 ha) at an elevation of 309 feet (94 m) above mean sea level. It has one runway designated 10/28 with an asphalt surface measuring 3,371 by 75 feet (1,027 x 23 m).

Penn Airways is a fixed-base operator located on the field.

For the 12-month period ending November 3, 2011, the airport had 37,217 aircraft operations, an average of 101 per day: 83% general aviation, 17% air taxi, and <1% military. At that time there were 91 aircraft based at this airport: 86% single-engine, 9% multi-engine, 2% jet, 1% helicopter, 1% glider, and 1% ultralight.

References

External links 
 Pottstown Aircraft Owners & Pilots
 History of Pottstown Limerick Airport
 Pottstown Limerick Airport (PTW) at PennDOT Bureau of Aviation
 Aerial photo as of February 2002 from USGS The National Map via MSR Maps
 

Airports in Pennsylvania
Transportation buildings and structures in Montgomery County, Pennsylvania